Lionsgate Television is the television division of Lionsgate, which is a Canadian–American entertainment company.

History
The company was established in 1997 as Lions Gate Television, Inc. with the establishment of Lionsgate Films. In 1998, it acquired documentary/reality production company Termite Art Productions but was itself acquired by Erik Nelson in 2004 and renamed Creative Differences. The company acquired Mandalay Television in 1997, before acquiring a minority investment in Mandalay Entertainment outright before splitting in 2002. Lionsgate sold off its shares in Mandalay Television in 1999.

In 1999, Lions Gate Television, Inc. became an incorporated entity. In 2003, Lionsgate and New Line Television set up a partnership to provide 20 motion pictures designed for television. In 2006, Lionsgate expanded into television syndication when the company acquired television distribution company Debmar-Mercury. Before the acquisition, Debmar-Mercury syndicated Lionsgate's film library.

20th Television handled advert sales to the series distributed by Debmar-Mercury with the exception of Meet the Browns, as the advert sales are handled by Disney–ABC Domestic Television with Turner Television Co. distributing the series.

On March 13, 2012, Lionsgate Television formed a new 50/50 joint venture, Sea to Sky Entertainment, with Thunderbird Films, the company founded by Lionsgate's founder and chairmsn, Frank Giustra.

Productions

References

External links
 Official website

Television production companies of the United States
Lionsgate subsidiaries